Suan Chitlada (RTGS: Suan Chit Lada) is a khwaeng (subdistrict) of Dusit District, in Bangkok, Thailand.

Naming
Its name refers to Chitralada Royal Villa, that is located in the subdistrict.

Geography
Most of the area of Suan Chitala is the royal court and government offices. It has a total area of 1.737 km2 (about 0.671 mi2).

It can be considered in the southeast of the district. The area is bordered by neighbouring subdistricts (from the north clockwise): Thanon Nakhon Chai Si in its district (Khlong Samsen is a borderline), Thung Phaya Thai of Ratchathewi District (Northern railway line is a borderline), Si Yaek Maha Nak in its district, Wat Sommanat of Pom Prap Sattru Phai District (Phitsanulok Road, Nakhon Sawan Road, and Khlong Phadung Krung Kasem are the borderlines), Dusit in its district (Khlong Prem Prachakon is a borderline), respectively.

Demography
In 2017 it had a total population of 9,211 people.

Places
Chitralada Royal Villa
King Rama IX Memorial Park (former Nang Loeng Racecours)
Rajavinit Mathayom School
Bank for Agriculture and Agricultural Co-operatives
Rajamangala University of Technology Phra Nakhon, Nang Loeng Campus
Sirirot Phanitchayakan School
Wat Sukhantharam

Transportation
Sukhothai Road
Rama V Road
Ratchawithi Road
Phitsanulok Road
 Nakhon Sawan Road
Si Ayutthaya Road
Ramathibodi Hospital Halt
Chitralada Railway Station

References

Subdistricts of Bangkok
Dusit district